Qatar-e Sofla (also Romanized as Qaţār-e Soflá; also known as Qaţār Qeshlāq) is a village in Angut-e Sharqi Rural District, Anguti District, Germi County, Ardabil Province, Iran. At the 2006 census, its population was 80, in 16 families.

References 

Tageo

Towns and villages in Germi County